is a Japanese science fiction light novel series written by Asato Asato and illustrated by Shirabii. It began publication by ASCII Media Works under their Dengeki Bunko imprint in February 2017. The series is licensed in North America by Yen Press.

A manga adaptation illustrated by Motoki Yoshihara was serialized in Square Enix's seinen manga magazine Young Gangan from February 2018 to June 2021, with two spin-off manga series—86: Operation High School by Suzume Somemiya and 86: Fragmental Neoteny—being serialized in Media Factory's seinen manga magazine Monthly Comic Alive from June 2020 to August 2021 and from April 2021 to October 2022, respectively. An anime television series adaptation produced by A-1 Pictures aired from April 2021 to March 2022.

Plot
The Republic of San Magnolia has been at war with the Empire of Giad for nine years. Though it initially suffered devastating losses to the Empire's autonomous mechanized Legions, the Republic has since developed its own autonomous units, called Juggernauts, which are directed remotely by a Handler. While on the surface, the public believes the war is being fought between machines, in reality, the Juggernauts are being piloted by humans, all of whom are "86"—the designation given to the Colorata minority of San Magnolia. The 86 originally had equal rights, but were persecuted and scapegoated by the dominant Alba race and the Alba-supremacist Republic government to the point where Colorata were both officially designated and popularly considered subhuman. The 86 were not permitted to have personal names and were immured in internment camps in the 86th District (their namesake), all the while being forced to fight in the Republic's war with the Empire to receive better treatment.

Major Vladilena "Lena" Milizé, an Alba noble and military officer in the San Magnolian military, is an outspoken activist against the grave mistreatment of the nation's Colorata minority, and the willful deception of the general public by the Republic government. She is assigned as the Handler of the Spearhead Squadron of the Eastern Front: an elite unit composed entirely of 86 veterans who have earned names. Led by their squad leader, Shinei "The Undertaker" Nouzen, the Spearhead Squadron is infamous among military officials. Its notoriety stems from the state in which its commanding officers are left: Handlers presiding over the squad have descended into insanity and some have gone as far as committing suicide. Lena, an avowed 86 sympathizer, gets to know the Spearhead Squadron in her time as head of the contingent. At the same time, Lena and Shinei learn a dark secret: the Republic and the war with the Empire are not what they seem.

Characters

Main characters
 / 

The leader of the 86  squadron who has fought in and survived countless battles despite only being 16 years old. Nicknamed The Reaper for his habit of keeping a box full of makeshift dogtags crafted out of a small piece of each dead comrade's Juggernaut, which he plans to bury when the war is over. Shin is known for his ruthlessness against both enemies and allies. It is rumored that previous Handlers who have dealt with him have gone insane and left the unit, retired, or even committed suicide for unknown reasons.

Commonly called . An officer in the San Magnolian military who got promoted to Major at just 16 years old thanks to a mixture of her skills and family connections. Lena has a habit of treating her 86 subordinates like humans, unlike other Handlers who treat the 86 as disposable objects. Lena is the newly-assigned Handler of the Republic's "Spearhead" squadron.

The adopted daughter of Ernst. She decides to join Shin and his crew at the Officer Training school in order to end the suffering of her knight, Kiriya, who was turned into a Legion Shepherd.

Spearhead Squadron
 /  

The Executive Officer and vice-captain of the Spearhead Squadron. A friend of Shin before they joined the same squad.
 / 

Known by his nickname . His callsign was inspired by an Alba commander who sacrificed himself to save Theo's unit. Theo is often blunt and sarcastic when dealing with others, especially their Handlers. He gives Lena a hard time, especially after seeing Kaie, a close friend and comrade die. Theo keeps a sketchbook that he draws in on his spare time, and designed several of the squadron's personal marks on their Juggernauts.
 / 

A very soft spoken and kind member. Anju was beaten and abused not just by Alba but by fellow 86 due her Alba heritage on her father's side. Anju grew her hair out to hide the scars on her back.
 / 

An active and caring girl, her parents were murdered by Alba soldiers in the past and her sister was conscripted into another 86 unit, never to be seen again. As a result, she carries intense hatred against all Albas. Kurena has feelings for Shin, and dislikes Lena both because of her race and the close relationship she forms with Shin. Despite this she grows to care, respect her though she is not very honest about it.
 / 
An Alba and new member of the squadron who volunteered after growing tired of the blatant hypocrisy of his people, citing how he and his family, immigrants from the Empire, were never branded traitors due to being Alba, whereas his entire class, comprising many races, was branded traitors and 86, dying in the decade-long legion war. He has feelings for Anju who he confesses to; though she considers him important to her she has yet to fully answer him, due to her lingering feelings for the deceased Daiya.

San Magnolia

One of Lena's few friends in the San Magnolia military. She works in the Research Division, specializing in the "Para-RAID" device that allows Handlers to instantly connect with the 86 combatants under their command. The device was partially created by her late father. It is revealed she is Shin's childhood friend and that she still feels guilty for not helping him and his family when the war began, but hides behind a mask of apathy which strains the relationship between her and Lena.

A Colonel in the San Magnolia military and a friend of Lena's father. While he cares for Lena like a niece, he at his core is a pessimist and has long been consumed by despair at the situation of the Republic. He believe that the republic deserves to be destroyed for its inhumane crimes against the 86, including himself for standing by and allowing it as a member of the military, as such he continues to perform what is required for him until his end comes. Despite falling out with Lena due to their differing states of mind he continues to watch over her from the side lines and later egging her on to make her dream a reality as he protects her by going out to face the legion. In his final moments he reveals he believes in Lena completely as he ends his own life while facing an old friend among the Legion.

 An engineer for the Spearhead squadron. It is revealed that he is an Alba; his wife and daughter were 86, so he dyed his hair and was enlisted as a volunteer to get their rights back (not that the Republic would ever do so). Despite seeming like an irate man, he cares for the remaining squad members and those who come after them. He constantly scold Shin for his reckless fighting which constantly damages his rig. He dies during the large scale offensive protecting young processors. He asks Shin if his wife and daughter are among the legion, Shin tells him they are not. However in his final moments Lex desired to take revenge for his family and for his comrades the 86, this leads him to willingly join the Legion to take revenge on the Republic.
 / 

The leader of the Brísingamen Squadron that Lena commands after the Spearhead Squadron was ended. Shiden's nickname is derived from her heterochromatic eyes that led to her being abused even by other 86 in their internment camp. She has a strained relationship with Shin, they do not get along personally at all but respect each others' abilities and trust each other in battle.

The former captain of the Halberd Squadron who died in battle 5 years prior to the story. In the prequel story she was somewhat a big sister figure to Shin who was on his first Squadron with her. She was also the original owner of Shin's scarf, who became his primary motivation to carry the fragments of his fallen comrades.
 / 
The former captain of the Stiletto Squadron who died in battle 5 years prior to the story. He took on the mentor role of Shin when he was in his squadron, presumably after Alice's Squadron fell. He was also the original owner of Shin's gun, who gave to the latter to end his suffering after being mortally wounded in his final moments while giving advice to save the last bullet for himself.

Giad Federacy

The Provisional President of the new Federacy that overthrew the Empire, a kindly old man who takes Frederica and the surviving members of Shin's squadron as his adopted children.

Nina's older brother, and the first person Shin befriended after his citizenship. Eugene was mercy-killed by Shin after a Legion attack. 

Eugene's sister.

The leader of the Federacy's Nordlicht Commandment where the 86s are under her command. She is nicknamed "spider woman" due to her obsessiveness of using the Reginleifs; an improved prototype of the Republic's Juggernauts.

Legion's Shephard

Shin's older brother who saved Lena from a Legion unit. Shourei felt powerless as to not protecting fellow 86s including his parents. In a fit of rage, he strangled Shin and blamed everything on his brother. His head was taken in Shin's 1st year as a Processor, and was turned into a Shephard by the Legion. During Spearhead's Special Recon mission, Shourei led a battalion of Legions to eliminate the remaining Juggernauts. Shourei died at the hands of Shin, finally coming to peace with his brother.

Kiriya is a descendant of the Nouzen family, and was Frederica's Imperial Knight. During the war, he killed a lot of people for the sake of Frederica and the Giad Empire. This turn of behaviour scared Frederica, so she faked her death to escape to the Giad Federacy.

Deceased Members of the Spearhead Squadron
 / 

Kaie is one of the oldest active members of the Spearhead squadron, who enjoys teasing her fellow teammates. She was killed in battle after her Juggernaut gets trapped in soft terrain and destroyed by enemy fire.
 / 

A friend of Anju who alternates between being compassionate and awkward.  It was implied that they had feelings towards each other. He was mercy killed by Shin to thwart the Legion's plan to create more Black Sheep.
 / 

A boisterous and somewhat lecherous member, however he does become serious when needed. He died prior to Spearhead's Special Recon mission.

One of the Spearhead Squadron members who is mercy-killed by Shinei after an early battle leaves him crippled and bleeding out.
 / 

 / 

 / 

 / 

 A female member of the squad. She committed suicide after her Juggernaut malfunctioned and before a Legion unit killed her.
 /

Production
One of the inspirations for the series was drone warfare, and the novel explores the logistics and ethics around this form of combat. Another major inspiration was the 2007 film The Mist. As she came up with the fictional ideas of the story, Asato started working on the light novel. Asato had been working on the novel since 2014 and it was only in 2017 that it was published. The setting of the story took a while for the author to come up with. She wanted the story to take place within a fortressed city. However, she switched the idea and finalized the current setting for the series. She usually spend about 6–8 hours a day writing.

Media

Light novels
The light novels are written by Asato Asato and are illustrated by Shirabii, with mechanical design by I-IV. ASCII Media Works has published twelve volumes since February 2017 under their Dengeki Bunko imprint. The light novels are licensed in North America by Yen Press, which has published eleven volumes as of November 22, 2022. The English version was translated by Roman Lempert.

Manga
A manga adaptation by Motoki Yoshihara was serialized in Square Enix's seinen manga magazine Young Gangan from February 16, 2018 to June 2021. It has been collected in three tankōbon volumes. The manga adaptation is also licensed in North America by Yen Press. On July 6, 2022, it was announced the manga was cancelled due to Yoshihara's health issues.

A spin-off manga series titled 86: Operation High School by Suzume Somemiya was serialized in Media Factory's seinen manga magazine Monthly Comic Alive from June 27, 2020, to August 27, 2021.

A third manga titled 86: Run Through the Battlefront by Hakuya Yamasaki was serialized in Square Enix's Manga UP! app from January 24, 2021 to September 2021. On July 6, 2022, it was announced the manga was cancelled due to Yamasaki's health issues.

A prequel manga series titled 86: Fragmental Neoteny was serialized in Monthly Comic Alive from April 26, 2021, to October 27, 2022. It was collected in three volumes, with the third volume being released as an ebook only.

A magical girl spin-off manga by Suzume Somemiya, titled 86: Mahō Shōjo Regina Lena ~Tatakae! Ginga Kōkō Senkan San Magnolia will begin serialization in Media Factory's Monthly Comic Alive magazine on March 27, 2023.

Anime

An anime television series adaptation was announced in a livestream commemorating the first anniversary of Kadokawa's "Kimirano" light novel website on March 15, 2020. It is produced by A-1 Pictures and directed by Toshimasa Ishii, with Toshiya Ōno writing the scripts, Tetsuya Kawakami designing the characters, and Hiroyuki Sawano and Kohta Yamamoto composing the music. The CGI will be developed by Shirogumi. The series was originally scheduled to air in 2020, but it was indefinitely delayed. The series is a split-cour anime, with the first half airing on Tokyo MX and other stations from April 11 to June 20, 2021. On March 28, 2021, Tokyo MX broadcast a special program commemorating the start of the series starring main cast members Shōya Chiba and Ikumi Hasegawa, producer Nobuhiro Nakayama and music composer Hiroyuki Sawano. The second half aired from October 3, 2021 to March 19, 2022. Crunchyroll licensed the series outside of Asia for an English simulcast and simuldub. Muse Communication licensed the series in Southeast Asia and is streaming it on iQIYI, Bilibili and Netflix. The first opening theme is "3-pun 29-byō" (San-pun Nijūkyū-byō; "3 Minutes 29 Seconds") by Hitorie, while the first ending theme is "Avid" by SawanoHiroyuki[nZk]:mizuki and the second theme is "Hands Up to the Sky" by SawanoHiroyuki[nZk]:Laco.  The second opening theme is "Kyōkaisen" ("Boundary Line") by amazarashi, while the third ending theme is "Alchemilla" by Regal Lily and the fourth ending theme is "LilaS" by SawanoHiroyuki[nZk]:Takahashi Honoka.

Reception
The light novel won the Grand Prize at the 23rd Dengeki Novel Prize award in 2016. The light novel also ranked second in 2018 in Takarajimasha's annual light novel guide book Kono Light Novel ga Sugoi!, in the bunkobon category. It ranked fifth in 2019.

Joe Ballard of Comic Book Resources noted the light novel's critical acclaim and called it "a movingly honest portrayal of war, drama, the supernatural, and the shockingly discriminatory views of a nation's general public, 86-Eighty-Six is anything but your standard light novel series." UK Anime News praised the first volume of the light novel, calling it thought-provoking, emotional and incredibly difficult to put down." The Fandom Post found the first volume "not particularly groundbreaking", but was impressed by the subversion of the "bloodless war" theme and found the development of the plot and characters "quite solid."

IGN listed the show as one of the best anime of 2021. Multiple writers from Anime News Network listed the anime's first season as one of their favorite series from spring 2021, with Steve Jones also naming the second season as his most anticipated for fall 2021.

The Fandom Post gave the show an A−, noting that although the first episode felt stiff and full of "technobabble", the show found its footing by episode two. At the close of season one, the site praised the show's stellar production value, solid animation and music, and beautiful conveyance of its themes. Callum May's review for Anime News Network also noted the series' improvement by episode two, describing the first few episodes as "surprisingly gripping", and offered specific praise to the show's directing, storyboarding, and animation.

The anime received four nominations at the 6th Crunchyroll Anime Awards in the categories: Anime of the Year, Best Drama, Best Girl, and Best Score.

Notes

References

External links
  
  
  
 

2017 Japanese novels
A-1 Pictures
Anime and manga based on light novels
Anime composed by Hiroyuki Sawano
Aniplex
Book series introduced in 2017
Crunchyroll anime
Dengeki Bunko
Gangan Comics manga
Japanese science fiction novels
Kadokawa Dwango franchises
Light novels
Mecha anime and manga
Media Factory manga
Military anime and manga
Muse Communication
Seinen manga
Tokyo MX original programming
Works about child soldiers
Works about race and ethnicity
Yen Press titles